Horacio Gramajo (10 May 1900 – 8 April 1943) was an Argentine bobsledder. He competed in the four-man event at the 1928 Winter Olympics.

References

1900 births
1943 deaths
Argentine male bobsledders
Olympic bobsledders of Argentina
Bobsledders at the 1928 Winter Olympics
Sportspeople from Buenos Aires